Hazul (born 1981) is a Portuguese graffiti and street artist.

Biography
Hazul started painting in the street in 1997, at the age of 16.
Hazul is one of Porto's most prominent street artists. In 2015 he published "Mapa Hazul", a script with dozens of murals that he made in the city of Porto.

Though his work has been mostly focused in his home city, he has also had some exposure internationally, particularly in Paris, where he has painted many murals and exhibited his works in group and solo shows.
A number of his commissioned murals are now considered landmarks in Porto, particularly his pieces by Trindade metro station and Estádio do Dragão, home of FC Porto.

The distinctive style of his work is a very familiar sight around the streets of Porto. Municipality of Porto's anti-graffiti department often preserves his works, rather than removing them.

Exhibitions

 2019, Prism - Le Cabinet D'amateur, Paris
 2019, Raiz - DaVinci Art Gallery, Porto
 2016, Epopeia - DaVinci Art Gallery, Porto
 2015, Turquesa - REM Espaço Arte, Porto
 2014, Prisma - Galeria Geraldes da Silva, Porto
 2014, Sinergia - Galeria Metamorfose, Porto
 2013, Cúbica - Galeria Almadas, Porto

References

External links

1981 births
Living people
Portuguese graffiti artists
Street artists